Asko Kase (born 26 February 1979 in Tallinn) is an Estonian film and television director.

In 2009 his film "December Heat" was nominated in 82nd Academy Awards for Best Foreign Language Film (see the list).

Filmography

 2000: "Buddha Of The North"
 2001: "Linnapiloot"
 2004: "Kooma"
 2006: "Hundi agoonia"
 2007: "Zen läbi prügi
 2008: "December Heat" ('Detsembrikuumus')
 2009: "Tondipoisid"
 2009:	"Baruto - tõlkes kaduma läinud"

References

Living people
1979 births
Estonian film directors
Tallinn University alumni
People from Tallinn